"Tear It Up" is the second single from rapper Yung Wun's debut album, The Dirtiest Thirstiest. It features DMX, Lil' Flip and David Banner.

The song samples and interpolates "Dancing Machine" by the Jackson 5 taken from the performance in the film Drumline without credit.

It peaked at No. 76 on the Billboard Hot 100, making it his only single to chart there and his most successful single to date.

Charts

Release history

References

2004 songs
2004 singles
David Banner songs
DMX (rapper) songs
Lil' Flip songs
J Records singles
Songs written by David Banner
Southern hip hop songs
Hardcore hip hop songs
Songs written by Hal Davis
Songs written by Dean Parks
Songs written by Dallas Austin
Songs written by Jasper Cameron
Songs written by Too Short
Songs written by DMX (rapper)
Songs written by Lil' Flip